Myroslav Dmytrovych "Miro" Slavov (born 8 September 1990) is a Ukrainian football forward.

Career
Slavov was born in Kyiv, in the Ukrainian SSR of the Soviet Union. After emigration from Ukraine together with his parents, he played for youth teams of different Austrian clubs. Then he signed his first professional contract and played for the reserves team of FC Girondins de Bordeaux in France Ligue 1, but he never made his debut for the main squad of the club. Next, he signed a contract with FC Anzhi Makhachkala in Russian Premier League on 27 August 2010.

He made his professional debut for Anzhi's main squad on 1 March 2011, when he started in a Russian Cup game against Zenit St. Petersburg.

Slavov signed for Vendsyssel FF on 2 September 2018. After six official games, his contract got terminated on 17 January 2019. A few days later he signed for Khor Fakkan Club in the United Arab Emirates. In May 2019, Slavov became UAE First Division League champion and promoted with Khor Fakkan Club to UAE Pro League. In August 2019, he was transferred to Riga FC in Latvian Virsliga. After he became champions with Riga FC too, he signed for Shahr Khodro F.C. in iranian's Persian Gulf Pro League in January 2020.

Personal life
Has an elder brother, Vadym Slavov, who was a professional football player. He played for the club FC Arsenal Bila Tserkva. His younger sister Oksana Slavova took part in the rhythmic gymnastics' World Championship in 2018.

His cousin is Marta Kostyuk, a Ukrainian professional tennis player.

In 2014, he competed in the sixth season of Austria's Next Topmodel. He was eliminated in episode 8. In January and February 2015, he participated in Rendezvous im Paradies, an Austrian dating reality series on Puls 4. Later this year he walked for Jean Paul Gaultier for his Fashion Show at the Life Ball in Vienna and for Dirk Bikkembergs for his spring/summer 2016 collection in Milan Fashion Week.

In 2018, Slavov appeared in Police's Shock-in-Scent perfume campaign. In 2019 he starred with David Hasselhoff in an advertisement for an Austrian gambling provider.

Miro is fluent in five languages: Ukrainian, English, Russian, French and German.

References

Breaking: Slavov verlässt KSC!, fanreport.com, 28 January 2016

External links

Profile at Official UEFA site
Profile at Official AFC site
Austria's next Topmodel - Boys & Girls - Miro - puls4.com (German)

Living people
1990 births
Association football forwards
Ukrainian footballers
Austrian footballers
Naturalised citizens of Austria
Ukrainian expatriate footballers
FC Anzhi Makhachkala players
FC Metalurh Donetsk players
First Vienna FC players
Kremser SC players
Berliner AK 07 players
Chemnitzer FC players
VfR Aalen players
Khor Fakkan Sports Club players
Vendsyssel FF players
Riga FC players
Top Model contestants
Russian Premier League players
Ukrainian Premier League players
Regionalliga players
3. Liga players
Danish Superliga players
2. Liga (Austria) players
UAE First Division League players
Latvian Higher League players
Ukrainian expatriate sportspeople in Austria
Ukrainian expatriate sportspeople in France
Ukrainian expatriate sportspeople in Russia
Ukrainian expatriate sportspeople in Germany
Ukrainian expatriate sportspeople in Denmark
Ukrainian expatriate sportspeople in the United Arab Emirates
Ukrainian expatriate sportspeople in Latvia
Ukrainian expatriate sportspeople in Iran
Expatriate footballers in Austria
Expatriate footballers in France
Expatriate footballers in Russia
Expatriate footballers in Germany
Expatriate men's footballers in Denmark
Expatriate footballers in Latvia
Expatriate footballers in the United Arab Emirates
Expatriate footballers in Iran
Ukrainian male models
Shahr Khodro F.C. players
Ukraine youth international footballers
Footballers from Kyiv